Alessandro Liborio Madrigal (born July 4, 1971) is an American comedian, writer, actor and producer. He is a co-founder of the All Things Comedy podcast network, alongside Bill Burr. He rose to fame on The Daily Show with Jon Stewart as a regular correspondent for five seasons. Outside of the standup world, he is known for his co-starring roles in the film Night School, Showtime's dark comedy I'm Dying Up Here, NBC's About A Boy, as well as CBS sitcoms Gary Unmarried and Welcome to The Captain. He has also performed on Conan and The Tonight Show Starring Jimmy Fallon.

He appeared in the sports drama The Way Back, starring Ben Affleck and directed by Gavin O'Connor. He appears in the Sony's Spider-Man Universe film Morbius as Alberto "Al" Rodriguez.

Early life
Madrigal was born in San Francisco, California. He grew up in San Francisco's Inner Sunset District, where his neighbors included future comedians Mike Pritchard and Margaret Cho. His father is Mexican (from Tijuana) and his mother is Sicilian. He attended Ecole Notre Dame Des Victoires, a private Catholic school in San Francisco that emphasizes instruction of French language and culture. He attended St. Ignatius College Preparatory High School for the class of 1989. He then attended the University of San Francisco.

Madrigal worked for 10 years in a human resources staffing agency run by his family, where one of his main responsibilities was firing people. He often worked humor into the job. He credits his experiences at the staffing company with preparing him for stand-up comedy: "I was in so many scary situations ... by the time I got on stage, I had no stage fright. Speaking in front of a group was nothing." In 1998, he decided to pursue a full-time career in comedy.

Career

Stand-up comedy
Madrigal's stand-up comedy is story-based, centering on his personal life, family, and the confusion caused by his multiethnic background. Early in his comedy career, he was often pigeonholed as a "Latino comic." Madrigal says he has been criticized as not being Latino enough, such as for not speaking Spanish.

Madrigal began his career in San Francisco's comedy clubs, both as a solo performer and as a member of the sketch group Fresh Robots, which he co-founded. In 2002, he enjoyed his first major exposure in two comedy festivals: SF Sketchfest, as part of Fresh Robots, and the "New Faces" showcase of the Just for Laughs Festival in Montreal.

In 2004, Madrigal won a jury award for best stand-up comedian at the U.S. Comedy Arts Festival in Aspen, Colorado. After winning the award, he signed a talent holding deal with CBS.

Madrigal's Comedy Central Presents half-hour special premiered in July 2005. In April 2013, Madrigal's first one-hour special, "Why Is The Rabbit Crying?," also premiered on Comedy Central. The special was named one of the top 10 comedy specials of 2013 by both Westword and The Village Voice and was praised for "deconstructing stereotypes rather than enforcing them" and "milking incongruity between expectations and reality to hilarious effect."

Madrigal taped his latest stand-up special, "Shrimpin' Ain't Easy" in December 2016 in the Masonic Lodge at Hollywood Forever Cemetery. Directed by Neal Brennan, the special premiered on SHOWTIME in 2017.

Madrigal has been a guest on Jimmy Kimmel Live! and The Late Late Show with Craig Ferguson. He appeared on The Tonight Show with Conan O'Brien on July 8, 2009. He later appeared on Conan's TBS Show, Conan, on May 10, 2011.

Acting

In 2003, Madrigal successfully auditioned for a starring role on The Ortegas, a comedy series for the Fox Network. The series, which was based on the BBC comedy The Kumars at No. 42, cast Madrigal as the son of a Mexican American family in California who hosts a TV talk show from a studio he operates in the backyard of his parents' home. However, the network dropped the series from its schedule before broadcasting any of its six filmed episodes.

In January 2008, Madrigal was cast as a building attendant named Jesús (pronounced "Hey-Soose") in the CBS comedy Welcome to The Captain. The series was cancelled after five episodes.

He co-starred in the CBS series Gary Unmarried (originally titled Project Gary), which debuted in September 2008.

On March 14, 2013, it was announced that Madrigal would be joining NBC's About A Boy as Andy, the main character's best friend. He received a 2014 Imagen Awards nomination for Best Supporting Actor for his work in the role.

Madrigal was a series regular on the Showtime series I'm Dying Up Here. He played a stand-up comedian named Edgar in the dark comedy about Los Angeles' infamous stand-up comedy scene of the 1970s. The show, which is based on William Knoedelseder's nonfiction book of the same name, is executive produced by Jim Carrey.

The Daily Show with Jon Stewart
On May 17, 2011, it was announced that Madrigal would be joining The Daily Show with Jon Stewart. He was often presented as the "Senior Latino Correspondent."

Madrigal auditioned for the show on the recommendation of stand-up comedian Adam Lowitt, one of the show's producers. Madrigal and Lowitt performed a piece at Carolines on Texas Representative Debbie Riddle, who proposed a bill that would create state punishments for those who "intentionally, knowingly, or recklessly" hired unauthorized immigrants except for domestic workers. Madrigal later did a reading of the piece with Jon Stewart, who hired him on the spot.

All Things Comedy
All Things Comedy was officially launched on October 1, 2012 with a roster of eleven podcasts including the Monday Morning Podcast by Bill Burr, The Long Shot Podcast by Eddie Pepitone, and Skeptic Tank by Ari Shaffir. By 2014, the network had six dozen members and over fifty podcasts. The network was started out by comedians Al Madrigal and Bill Burr with The Daily Show on the All Things Comedy website. The network was established as an artist owned cooperative, which Madrigal and Burr emphasize as an importance aspect of the collective. All Things Records was started in March 2014 and released three albums in the months following its creation including Believe in Yourself by Sam Tripoli, Live at the Comedy Castle by Brian Scolaro, This Will Make an Excellent Horcrux by Jackie Kashian. Madrigal sees the network as a way of improving representation of Latin American people in media. For instance, the networks provides Spanish-language podcasts such as Leyendas Legendarias and El Dollop. Comedy Central partnered with All Things Comedy to produce a documentary about Patrice O'Neal as well as three comedy specials.

In 2012, Madrigal and comedian Bill Burr founded All Things Comedy, a comedy podcast network and artist cooperative. Madrigal and Burr started the network as a way to help comedians maintain full ownership of their work.  The network hosts over 50 podcasts and garners nearly 5 million listeners per month.

At South by Southwest 2015, Madrigal, Burr, and comedian Doug Benson spoke on the "Owning Your Work: The Future of All Things Comedy" panel, where they "discussed the ins and outs of their operation and how they are working to help comics carve out their own paths in show business and avoid traditional gatekeepers."

From 2010 to 2014, he co-hosted a podcast called "Minivan Men" with comedians Maz Jobrani, Aaron Aryanpur, and Chris Spencer, in which they discussed marriage, parenting, and domestic issues.

Madrigal and Burr host the "All Things Comedy Live Podcast," which streams monthly. The podcast has featured comics including Sinbad, Nick Thune, Felipe Esparza, Doug Benson, Pete Holmes, Ian Edwards, and Fred Stoller.

More recently, he signed a deal with CBS Studios.

Half Like Me
On January 22, 2015, Madrigal's one-hour comedic documentary special, Half Like Me, premiered on Fusion. The program follows Madrigal on his quest to get closer to his Mexican roots in preparation for a family reunion in Tijuana, Mexico. During the course of the program Madrigal explores different aspects of Latino culture in the U.S. The A.V. Club called it "solid and thought-provoking" while the Los Angeles Times listed the special as a "Critic's Pick". In an interview with LA Weekly, Madrigal said, "'people are actually reaching out and wanting to teach this in their classrooms.'"

Filmography

Film

Television

Web series

Awards and nominations

References

External links

 
 

1971 births
Living people
American male film actors
American stand-up comedians
American male television actors
Hispanic and Latino American male actors
Male actors from San Francisco
American people of Italian descent
Comedians from California
American television personalities of Mexican descent
20th-century American comedians
21st-century American comedians
Male television personalities
Stand Up! Records artists
American male actors of Mexican descent